The National Philharmonic in Warsaw (Polish: Filharmonia Narodowa w Warszawie) is a Polish cultural institution, located at 5 Jasna Street in Warsaw. The building was built between 1900 and 1901, under the direction of Karol Kozłowski, to be reconstructed in 1955 by Eugeniusz Szparkowski. The director of the institution is Wojciech Nowak. It is the main venue of the Warsaw National Philharmonic Orchestra.

Since 1955, the institution hosts the International Chopin Piano Competition.

The building hosts the annual festival Warsaw Autumn.

Gallery

References

External links 
 

Concert halls in Poland
1901 establishments in Poland
Music venues completed in 1901
Music venues completed in 1955
Tourist attractions in Warsaw